Sardou is a surname, and may refer to:

 Saint Sacerdos of Limoges, also known as Saint Sardou
 Victorien Sardou, French dramatist
 Victorien Sardou was also the basis for naming Eggs Sardou, which is a part of Creole cuisine. 
 Fernand Sardou (1910–1976), a French singer and actor, father of Michel Sardou
 Michel Sardou, French singer
 Davy Sardou (born 1978), a French actor, son of Michel Sardou
 Romain Sardou, French novelist
 Jackie Sardou, née Rollin (1919–1998), a French actress, wife of Fernand Sardou
 Joseph-Marie Sardou (1922–2009), a French Roman Catholic archbishop

Occitan-language surnames